"Let's Go To Vegas" is a song written by Karen Staley, and recorded by American country music artist Faith Hill.  It was released in July 1995 as the lead single from the album It Matters to Me.

Content
In the song, the protagonist persuades her lover to elope to Las Vegas.

Music video
A video was released featuring Hill singing and dancing in skin tight PVC pants, a white T-shirt, and black satin outfits among typical Vegas icons such as an Elvis impersonator, Showgirls, and Casino fare.

Chart positions

Year-end charts

References

Songs about Las Vegas
1995 singles
1995 songs
Faith Hill songs
Song recordings produced by Scott Hendricks
Warner Records singles
Songs written by Karen Staley